The 2019–20 Greek betshop.gr Basket League was the 80th season of the Greek Basket League, the top-tier level professional club basketball league in Greece. The season started in September 2019, and ended prematurely in March 2020, due to the COVID-19 pandemic. On 21 May 2020, after a vote that was held between the league's 14 teams, Panathinaikos was crowned the Greek basketball league's champion for the season, marking the club's 38th Greek championship. The league's 14 teams also agreed that none of the teams would be relegated.

Proposed format changes
On 15 May 2019, the Greek Basket League announced that it was planning to expand from 14 teams to 16 teams, and that there were no league relegations scheduled from the previous 2018–19 Greek Basket League season. The teams that were scheduled to be promoted up from the secondary level Greek A2 Basket League, were to be inserted into the new 16-team league, for the 2019–20 season. However, Olympiacos was later relegated on 22 May 2019, following a meeting of the Hellenic Basketball Clubs Association's Board of Directors. 

Olympiacos was relegated because the club refused to play in its playoff series against Panathinaikos. That marked the club's third forfeited game of the season, which resulted in an automatic relegation, per league rules. As further punishment, the league also stripped Olympiacos of its season wins. The league also eventually cancelled the planned expansion to 16 teams, after the proposal was rejected by the Hellenic Basketball Federation.

Teams

Promotion and relegation
Relegated from the Greek Basket League 2018–19 season
Olympiacos decided not to play against Panathinaikos in the league's playoffs, and was thus relegated down to the Greek Second Division as punishment. In addition, all of the club's wins were voided by league officials.

Promoted from the Greek A2 Basket League 2018–19 season
Ionikos Nikaias won the A2 League championship, and was thus promoted up to the first tier level, for the first time in 32 years. Iraklis Thessaloniki was also promoted, as a result of winning the playoffs round of the Greek second division. The club returned to the top-level league, after an absence of 8 years.

Locations and arenas

Head coaching changes

Regular season

League table

Results

Clubs in European-wide competitions

See also
2019–20 Greek Basketball Cup
2019–20 Greek A2 Basket League (2nd tier)

References

External links 
 Official Basket League Site 
 Official Basket League Site 
 Official Hellenic Basketball Federation Site 

Greek Basket League seasons
1
Greek
Greek Basket League